The Fateful Dark is the third studio album from British heavy metal band Savage Messiah, released by Earache Records in Europe and Century Media Records in the USA.

Production

The band returned to Grindstone Studios in Suffolk, England and producer Scott Atkins (who they had worked with previously on their 2009 album Insurrection Rising and 2012 album Plague Of Conscience) to record The Fateful Dark, between July and October 2013.

Release
The album was released in Europe on 10 March 2014, by Earache Records, and then a little over a week later in the USA on 18 March 2014, by Century Media Records.
As well as being released in standard CD and digital formats, The Fateful Dark was made available on a limited run of 1,000 Limited Edition gatefold vinyl records (400 on Black vinyl, 300 on Cross of Babylon Orange vinyl, 200 on Hellblazer Red/Yellow vinyl and 100 on Inconocaust Clear vinyl).
In February 2014 an official music video for "Hellblazer" was released, directed by Tom Walsh and featuring contortionist and Game of Thrones star Pixie Le Knot.

Track listing

Personnel

Savage Messiah
Dave Silver – vocals, guitar
Joff Bailey – guitar
Stefano Selvatico – Bass guitar
Andrea Gorio – Drums

Additional musicians
Jon Ewen – Additional keyboards on "Live as One" and "Zero Hour"

Additional personnel
Scott Atkins – Production, mixing, engineering and mastering

References

Savage Messiah (band) albums
Earache Records albums
2014 albums